Jody Bunting (born 27 January 1978), is a fitness instructor who was the 31-stone TV host of Lose it with Jody on Channel 4 television's former morning show The Big Breakfast between 2001 and 2002.

Early life 
Bunting was born on 27 January 1978 in Burton-on-Trent, Staffordshire, England. In 2000, he became father of a girl. One year later, he separated from the mother of his child.

Career 

In 2001, Bunting stopped working at a call centre to teach fitness full-time. He also starred in the line up to turn on the Burton-upon-Trent Christmas lights.

After losing  between 2001 and 2004, Bunting underwent surgery in 2004 to remove his excess skin.

He has won the "Group Exercise Manager of the Year"-award in 2005.

Bunting moved to work in Egypt in 2006 and his company "The Fat Factor" was featured on BBC's The One Show in 2008.

In 2009, he advised that less stress would encourage losing weight and launched relaxation and fitness classes with Lesley Smith. In October 2009, Bunting helped raising money for a breast cancer charity by cycling in pink and by abseiling down Derby Cathedral raised money in aid of the Derby Mountain Rescue Team.

He offered weight-loss courses in Derby in 2010 and some of his clients were featured in the local newspaper for their weight loss success.

In 2016, Bunting offered free online weight loss courses called Slim Brother, plus classes in Derby and Burton-upon-Trent. He revealed that in his 15 years in the fitness industry he would have helped over 5,000 people lose weight and taught over 78,000 hours of fitness classes.

Bunting presented a talent show, "Sharm's Got Talent", in Sharm el-Sheikh, Egypt in 2017.

In 2018, Bunting came out publicly as gay on a YouTube video and champions Derbyshire LGBT+ Pride, admitting he knew he was gay when he was 13-years-old.

He re-started his fitness program Slim Brother after parting company with Weight Watchers in 2019.

In 2021 Aldi UK hired Bunting to taste test their new Easter Chocolate Egg range.

In 2022 Bunting dressed up as "Pink Gaga" and appeared in his local village carnival. Later in the year he supported one of his slimmers to run the London Marathon. 

2023 saw Bunting's daughter Phoebe thank him publicly for helping her transform her body when she became vegan. Later in the year Bunting wrote a piece for Derbyshire Live stating why he thinks obesity shouldn't be normalised.

Filmography

External links

References 

Channel 4 people
Living people
People from South Derbyshire District
1978 births